Under the Flag is the third studio album released on September 1 1982, by experimental electronic artist Fad Gadget. It was recorded at Blackwing Studios, All Hallows Church, London. The album produced by Fad Gadget and John Fryer.

Written by Frank Tovey for the most part concerning his fear for the future of the world, in light of having just become a father.  He was apparently afraid of the world his daughter was going to grow up in. Sampling, which was new technology back in the early 1980s is incorporated into the album and sequencing is also heavily used.  It features backing vocals by fellow Mute Records artist Alison Moyet, known for working on, at the time Yazoo with Vince Clarke.

The naming of the album was the subject of a brief legal dispute with Under The Flag, an unsigned electro progressive group using the same name at the time.  As reported in Smash Hits, the band yielded and renamed themselves The Archive.

"Scapegoat" features a Dutch nursery rhyme. Some of the ideas on this album were heavily inspired by German band Die Krupps and this is borne out by Fad Gadget's later album Gag which features Einstürzende Neubauten, who worked closely with Die Krupps.

Tracklist 
"Under the Flag I"
"Scapegoat"
"Love Parasite"
"Plainsong"
"Wheels of Fortune"
"Life on the Line IV"
"The Sheep Look Up"
"Cipher"
"For Whom the Bells Toll"
"Under the Flag II"Recorded at Blackwing Studios, All Hallows Church, London in 1982.

Personnel
Fad Gadget – vocals, synthesizer, computer
Nick Cash – timpani, vibraphone, percussion 
David Simmonds – grand piano, synthesizer
Alison Moyet, Andrew Kay, Anne Clift, Barbara Frost, Jill Tipping, John Fryer, Yvette Anna - chorus

References

Fad Gadget albums
1982 albums
Mute Records albums
Albums produced by John Fryer (producer)